The 2020 Tokyo gubernatorial election took place on 5 July 2020 to elect the Governor of Tokyo.  In a result viewed as an endorsement of her handling of Tokyo's response to the COVID-19 pandemic, incumbent Yuriko Koike was re-elected for a second term  in a landslide, increasing her share of the vote to 59.7%.

Candidates
A total of 22 candidates registered candidacies for the election.

Incumbent Governor Yuriko Koike announced her campaign for re-election on 12 June 2020. Similar to her first campaign for Governor, Koike ran as an independent and did not receive the endorsement of any party, aside from the support of the regional Tomin First party which she founded in 2017. The ruling Liberal Democratic Party considered endorsing Koike in the 2020 election, unlike in the 2016 gubernatorial election in which the party endorsed a separate candidate, however the party ultimately chose not to endorse any candidate, instead encouraging members to vote freely. Koike was widely expected to win a second term, based on opinion polling conducted in the weeks prior the election.

Kenji Utsunomiya, a lawyer and former chairman of the Japan Federation of Bar Associations, announced his candidacy on 28 May 2020. Utsunomiya was considered the main opposition to Koike, having received endorsements from a coalition of opposition parties including the Constitutional Democratic Party, the Communist Party and the Social Democratic Party. This was Utsunomiya's third campaign for Governor of Tokyo, having also ran in the 2012 and 2014 elections.

Other notable candidates included Tarō Yamamoto, a former actor who founded the anti-establishment and anti-nuclear energy party Reiwa Shinsengumi in 2019, Taisuke Ono, the former Vice Governor of Kumamoto, whose candidacy received the endorsement of Nippon Ishin no Kai, Makoto Sakurai, a far-right activist and the founder and leader of the Japan First Party, and Takashi Tachibana, the head of the NHK Party and a former member of the House of Councillors.

Tokyo Review described the election as a "circus" viewed by many candidates as marketing opportunity:

 For less than $30,000, each candidate gets several minutes to broadcast whatever they want on NHK, an official statement delivered to every single household in Tokyo, and a prime outdoor location on every street in the city for their posters for two weeks.

Results

Simultaneous legislative by-elections 
Four by-elections to the assembly were held together with the gubernatorial election: in Ota Ward, Kita Ward, Hino City and the North Tama 3rd electoral district (=Chofu City+Komae City). All four were won by LDP candidates.

References

Tokyo gubernatorial elections
2020 elections in Japan
July 2020 events in Japan
2020 in Tokyo